MIBC may refer to:
Madeira International Business Center, a set of tax benefits available in Madeira, Portugal.
Moscow International Business Center, the central business district in Moscow, Russia.
Methyl Isobutyl Carbinol, a reagent used in froth flotation.
Muscle invasive bladder cancer